Billy Hennessy (born 15 August 1997) is an Irish hurler who plays as a left wing-back for club side St Finbarr's and at senior level with the Cork county team. He usually lines out as a left wing-back.

Playing career

Christian Brothers College
Hennessy first came to prominence as a hurler with Christian Brothers College, a school noted as a rugby union stronghold. Having played hurling in every grade of hurling during his time at the school, he usually lined out in the half-back line on the school's senior team. On 14 October 2015, Hennessy was at right wing-back on the CBC team that recorded a first victory in the Dr Harty Cup in 97 years.

St Finbarr's
Hennessy joined the St Finbarr's club at a young age and played in all grades at juvenile and underage levels as a dual player of hurling and Gaelic football.

On 28 September 2015, Hennessy was at full-back when the St Finbarr's minor football team defeated Douglas by 1-09 to 0-08 in the final to win a fifth Premier 1 MFC title in nine years.

Hennessy subsequently progressed onto the St Finbarr's under-21 football team. On 6 August 2016, he was at left corner-back on the under-21 team that defeated Ilen Rovers by 1-12 to 0-07 to win the Cork Under-21 Championship title.

Cork

Minor and under-21
Hennessy first played for Cork at minor level during the 2015 Munster Championship. He made his only appearance in the grade on 2 July when he came on as a 53rd-minute substitute for John Looney in a 1-14 to 0-14 defeat by Limerick.

Hennessy subsequently progressed onto the Cork under-21 team. He made his first appearance on 13 July 2017 when he played at left wing-back in a 2-17 to 1-19 Munster semi-final defeat of Waterford. Hennessy was dropped from the starting fifteen for Cork's subsequent 0-16 to 1-11 defeat by Limerick on 26 July 2017.

Hennessy won a Munster Championship medal on 4 July 2018 when he lined out at right wing-back in Cork's 2-23 to 1-13 defeat of Tipperary in the final. On 26 August, he was switched to left wing-back in Cork's 3-13 to 1-16 All-Ireland final defeat by Tipperary in what was his last game in the grade. Hennessy was later named at left wing-back on the Team of the Year.

Senior
Hennessy made his first appearance for the Cork senior hurling team in the pre-season Canon O'Brien Cup on 6 January 2017. He scored a point from midfield in the 0-22 to 1-13 defeat by University College Cork. On 15 January, Hennessy also scored a point after being introduced as a 62nd-minute substitute in Cork's 7-22 to 1-19 defeat of Limerick in the Munster Hurling League. He played no further role in Cork's National League or Championship campaigns.

Hennessy was a late addition to the Cork senior team during the 2018 All-Ireland Championship. On 29 July, he was an unused substitute when Cork suffered a 3-32 to 2-21 extra-time defeat by Limerick in the All-Ireland semi-final.

Hennessy was ruled out of the start of the 2019 season as he was recuperating after an operation.

Career statistics

Club

Inter-county

Honours

St. Finbarr's
Cork Premier Senior Hurling Championship: 2022 (c)
Cork Premier Senior Football Championship: 2021
Cork Under-21 Football Championship: 2016
Seandún Under-21 Football Championship: 2016, 2017, 2018
Cork Premier 1 Minor Football Championship: 2015

Cork
Munster Under-21 Hurling Championship: 2018

References

External link
Billy Hennessy profile at the Cork GAA website

1997 births
Living people
St Finbarr's hurlers
St Finbarr's Gaelic footballers
Cork inter-county hurlers
Cork inter-county Gaelic footballers
Hurling backs
Dual players